Atlantic Health System is one of the largest non-profit health care networks in New Jersey. It employs 18,000 people and more than 4,800 affiliated physicians. The  

system offers more than 400 sites of care, including six hospitals: Chilton Medical Center, Goryeb Children’s Hospital, Hackettstown Medical Center, Morristown Medical Center, Newton Medical Center and Overlook Medical Center. 

Atlantic Health System serves more than half of the state of New Jersey, including 11 counties and 4.9 million people. Its medical centers have a combined total of 1,860 licensed beds and 4,796 affiliated physicians that provide a wide array of health care services. With more than 340 medical residents and several allied health certificate programs, Atlantic Health System trains New Jersey's future health care professionals and provides the most comprehensive services in the region.

The company has been ranked on the FORTUNE 100 Great Place to Work list 13 years in a row. Atlantic Health System also includes the best hospital in New Jersey, Morristown Medical Center, according to both US News & World Report and Newsweek.

The president and chief executive of Atlantic Health System is Brian A. Gragnolati, a former Chairman of the Board of Trustees of the American Hospital Association.

History

25th Anniversary 
Atlantic Health System was founded in 1996 through the merger of Morristown Memorial Hospital, Overlook Hospital, Mountainside Hospital, and soon after, the General Hospital Center at Passaic. Over the next quarter century, Atlantic Health System evolved to meet the expanding needs of the 11 counties and 4.9 million people it serves. Including Morristown Medical Center, Overlook Medical Center and Goryeb Children’s Hospital, Atlantic Health System grew to include Newton Medical Center (2011), Chilton Medical Center (2014) and Hackettstown Medical Center (2016), along with the new Atlantic Rehabilitation Institute (2019), new partnership with CentraState Health System (2021), and longstanding alliance with Hunterdon Healthcare (2014).

CentraState acquisition 
On October 22, 2020, officials from Atlantic Health System announced that they were acquiring a 51% stake in Freehold based CentraState Healthcare System. As a part of the deal, CentraState will continue to govern themselves while Atlantic Health System has committed to invest $135 million into the hospital.

Medicare overbilling allegations 
On June 21, 2012, the U.S. Department of Justice announced that AHS Hospital Corp., Atlantic Health System Inc., and Overlook Hospital agreed to pay the United States $8,999,999 to settle allegations that they violated the False Claims Act by allegedly overbilling Medicare.  The settlement was part of the Health Care Fraud Prevention and Enforcement Action Team (HEAT) initiative. The settlement resolved allegations that Overlook Hospital, owned and operated by AHS Hospital Corporation, and Atlantic Health Systems Inc., overbilled Medicare for patients who were treated on an inpatient basis when they should have been treated as either observation patients or on an outpatient basis.

Facilities 
Atlantic Medical Group is a physician-led and physician-governed organization with more than 1,000 doctors, nurse practitioners and physician assistants at over 300 locations throughout northern and central New Jersey and northeast Pennsylvania.

Chilton Medical Center is a community hospital that offers personalized care and top programs for surgery, cancer and comprehensive wound healing. It received the Lifeline Bronze Receiving Quality Achievement Award from the American Heart Association. In addition, The Joint Commission recognized the medical center as a Primary Stroke Center.

Goryeb Children’s Hospital is a national and state-designated children’s hospital with more than 20 pediatric subspecialties located on the same campus as Morristown Medical Center. Goryeb Children's Hospital has more than 250 community pediatricians on staff and more than 100 board-certified pediatric specialists. The hospital is New Jersey’s leader in the treatment of pediatric cancer and houses a pediatric intensive care unit (PICU) with 15 inpatient beds. It was named the top Pediatric Emergency Care provider and Best Children's Hospital by the Women's Choice Awards.

Hackettstown Medical Center is a community hospital that has been providing health care to Warren, Sussex and Morris Counties in New Jersey since 1973. The medical center maintains several designations, including Primary Stroke Center from both the New Jersey Department of Health and Senior Services and The Joint Commission’s advanced certification program; accreditations from the American College of Radiology for mammography, nuclear medicine and ultrasound; sleep disorder center accreditation from the American Academy of Sleep Medicine; and Quality of Care recognition for its cardiopulmonary department from the American Association for Respiratory Care. Hackettstown Medical Center is designated a Primary Stroke Center by The Joint Commission.

Morristown Medical Center is the flagship hospital of Atlantic Health System. Its regional Level I Trauma Center is verified by the American College of Surgeons and it is designated a Level II Trauma Center by the state of New Jersey. The medical center is a nationally-recognized leader in cardiology, orthopedics, nursing, critical care and geriatrics. Morristown Medical Center performs the second most heart surgeries in the New York metropolitan area. Morristown Medical Center is a Magnet Hospital for Excellence in Nursing Service, the highest level of recognition achievable from the American Nurses Credentialing Center for facilities that provide acute care services. It was rated the number one hospital in New Jersey by U.S. News & World Report and Newsweek.

Newton Medical Center has served its community since 1932 and offers a variety of inpatient and outpatient programs and services in a state-of-the-art environment. It was recognized in the top 10% in the nation for the treatment of stroke, and has five star ratings for the treatment of heart failure, respiratory failure and sepsis, according to Healthgrades. It was recognized as one of the safest hospitals in the nation by The Leapfrog Group. Newton Medical Center recently achieved the American Nurses Credentialing Center’s Pathway to Excellence designation. It is one of the few health care facilities in New Jersey accredited by the Intersocietal Accreditation Commission (IAC) in all three echocardiography procedures: adult transthoracic, adult transesophogeal and adult stress. It is home to the Center for Breast Health, the only one of its kind in Sussex County.

Overlook Medical Center is the regional leader in comprehensive stroke care and neuroscience services, was the first medical center in the Northeast to utilize CyberKnife robotic image-guided technology. It was named one of America's 50 Best Hospitals by Healthgrades and recognized as a Best Regional Hospital in the New York Metro area by U.S. News & World Report. Located on the Overlook campus, the Atlantic Neuroscience Institute is the region’s leader in neuroscience care. Overlook Medical Center achieved the prestigious Magnet® recognition from the American Nurses Credentialing Center, the highest national honor for nursing excellence. It has advanced certification from The Joint Commission for perinatal care, behavioral health care, spine surgery, wound care, and primary care medical home (PCMH).

Atlantic Health System Medical Pavilions are facilities that provide primary and specialty care, screening and diagnostic services that are located outside the system's medical centers. Currently, there are Medical Pavilions located in Clark, Mountain Lakes, Rockaway and Paramus.

Specialty areas 
Atlantic Health System provides care in the following specialty areas:

 Bariatrics – Atlantic Health System has a comprehensive medical and surgical weight loss program that includes psychological, nutritional and exercise support
 Behavioral Health – Atlantic Behavioral Health offers an array of mental health, substance abuse and inpatient programs for adolescents and adults.
 Cancer Care – Atlantic Health System Cancer Care offers oncology treatment, prevention, clinical trials and research programs
 Children's Health – Goryeb Children's Hospital is the hub of children's health at Atlantic Health System with a wide array of pediatric specialty areas.
 Digestive Diseases – U.S. News & World Report rated Morristown Medical Center a high performing hospital in gastroenterology and GI surgery.
 Emergency Services – Each medical center in the system contains an emergency department and many locations offer stroke care, pediatric emergency care, cardiovascular services, diagnostic imaging and fast-track areas for the treatment of minor injuries and illnesses
 Heart Care – The Gagnon Cardiovascular Institute is home to the largest cardiac surgery program in New Jersey and is ranked as one of the 40 best hospitals in the nation for cardiology and heart surgery by US News & World Report.
 Neuroscience – The Atlantic Neuroscience Institute is recognized by Healthgrades as one of America’s 100 Best Hospitals for Stroke and recognized Overlook Medical Center among the top five percent of hospitals in the U.S. for excellence in the treatment of Stroke, Cranial Neurosurgery and Neurosciences
 Orthopedics – The Atlantic Orthopedic Institute is a nationally-recognized center for multidisciplinary treatments that span pre-surgical education through post-operative rehabilitation
 Pulmonary Services – The Atlantic Respiratory Institute offers state-of-the-art diagnostic and treatments for a wide variety of respiratory conditions
 Rehabilitation and Physical Therapy – Atlantic Rehabilitation locations have received numerous recognitions, including the Gold Seal of Approval for cervical and lumbar spine treatments and joint replacement by The Joint Commission
 Senior Services – Atlantic Health System offers a variety of geriatric services at Morristown Medical Center's David and Joan Powell Center for Healthy Aging, Overlook Medical Center, Newton Medical Center and Chilton Medical Center.
 Surgery – General, specialty and minimally invasive surgeries are performed by fellowship-trained, board-certified surgeons, anesthesiology specialists, nurses, care managers using the latest technology.
 Visiting Nurse Services – Atlantic Visiting Nurse supports patients recovering from illness or surgery, those coping with chronic conditions, families facing end-of-life care, and older adults needing help to remain living independently.
 Women's Health – Atlantic Health provides specialized women's health services for every stage of life. Morristown Medical Center was ranked one of the 40 best hospitals in the nation for gynecology by U.S. News & World Report.

Reputation and Rankings 

 Atlantic Health System has been named by FORTUNE magazine as a Great Place to Work for 13 years in a row
 FORTUNE also named Atlantic Health System a Best Workplace in Healthcare and Biopharma
 Morristown Medical Center was named the best hospital in New Jersey by US News & World Report and one of the World’s Best Hospitals by Newsweek
 Health Grades named Morristown Medical Center one of America’s 50 Best Hospitals
 Leapfrog recognized Morristown Medical Center with an “A” hospital safety grade, its highest, eleven consecutive times
 Overlook Medical Center was named one of America's 50 Best Hospitals in 2021 by Healthgrades
 Overlook Medical Center was named as one of the World’s Best Hospital by Newsweek and recognized as a Best Regional Hospital in the New York metro area by U.S. News & World Report for 10 consecutive years
 The Centers for Medicare and Medicaid Services awarded Atlantic Health System with its highest five-star rating in 2020
 Castle Connelly has recognized Atlantic Health System medical centers, including Morristown and Chilton Medical Centers, as top hospitals in New Jersey

Affiliations 
Atlantic Health System is a founding member of AllSpire Health Partners, an alliance of seven health care systems that come together to serve patients, families and communities in New Jersey, New York, Maryland and Pennsylvania. AllSpire improves the quality, affordability and access to health care by sharing clinical, intellectual and economic capabilities. This consortium has undertaken joint activities in key areas of population health management, patient care services, research and education to enhance the value of health care.

Atlantic Health System has medical school affiliations with the Sidney Kimmel Medical College at Thomas Jefferson University, Mount Sinai School of Medicine, Robert Wood Johnson Medical School, Rowan-Virtua School of Osteopathic Medicine

Atlantic Health System serves as the Official Health Care Partner of the New York Jets.

See also 
 Atlantic Medical Group
 Chilton Medical Center
 Goryeb Children’s Hospital
 Hackettstown Medical Center
 Morristown Medical Center
 Newton Medical Center
 Overlook Medical Center

References

External links

Companies based in Morris County, New Jersey
Morristown, New Jersey
Health care companies based in New Jersey
Hospital networks in the United States